Events from the year 1829 in Germany

Incumbents

Kingdoms 
 Kingdom of Prussia
 Monarch – Frederick William III of Prussia (16 November 1797 – 7 June 1840)
 Kingdom of Bavaria
 Monarch - Ludwig I (1825–1848)
 Kingdom of Saxony
 Anthony (5 May 1827 – 6 June 1836)
 Kingdom of Hanover
 George IV  (29 January 1820 – 26 June 1830)
 Kingdom of Württemberg
 William (30 October 1816 – 25 June 1864)

Grand duchies 
 Grand Duke of Baden
 Louis I (8 December 1818 – 30 March 1830)
 Grand Duke of Hesse
 Louis I (14 August 1806 – 6 April 1830)
 Grand Duke of Mecklenburg-Schwerin
 Frederick Francis I– (24 April 1785 – 1 February 1837)
 Grand Duke of Mecklenburg-Strelitz
 George (6 November 1816 – 6 September 1860)
 Grand Duke of Oldenburg
 Peter I (2 July 1823 - 21 May 1829)
 Grand Duke of Saxe-Weimar-Eisenach
 Charles Frederick (14 June 1828 - 8 July 1853)

Principalities 
 Schaumburg-Lippe
 George William (13 February 1787 - 1860)
 Schwarzburg-Rudolstadt
 Friedrich Günther (28 April 1807 - 28 June 1867)
 Schwarzburg-Sondershausen
 Günther Friedrich Karl I (14 October 1794 - 19 August 1835)
 Principality of Lippe
 Leopold II (5 November 1802 - 1 January 1851)
 Principality of Reuss-Greiz
 Heinrich XIX (29 January 1817 - 31 October 1836)
 Waldeck and Pyrmont
 George II (9 September 1813 - 15 May 1845)

Duchies 
 Duke of Anhalt-Dessau
 Leopold IV (9 August 1817 - 22 May 1871)
 Duke of Brunswick
 Charles II (16 June 1815 – 9 September 1830)
 Duke of Saxe-Altenburg
 Duke of Saxe-Hildburghausen (1780–1826) and Duke of Saxe-Altenburg (1826–1834) - Frederick
 Duke of Saxe-Meiningen
 Bernhard II (24 December 1803–20 September 1866)

Events 
 19 January – August Klingemann's adaptation of Johann Wolfgang von Goethe's Faust premieres in Braunschweig.
 11 March – German composer Felix Mendelssohn conducts the first performance of Johann Sebastian Bach's St Matthew Passion since the latter's death in 1750, in Berlin; the success of this performance sparks a revival of interest in Bach.
 April–September– Felix Mendelssohn pays his first visit to Britain. This includes the first London performance of his concert overture to A Midsummer Night's Dream, and his trip to Fingal's Cave.
 University of Stuttgart founded.

Births 
 3 January – Konrad Duden, German philologist (d. 1911)
 2 February- Alfred Brehm, German zoologist (d. 1884)
 24 February – Friedrich Spielhagen, German novelist (died 1911)
 2 March – Carl Schurz, German revolutionary, American statesman (d. 1906)
 1 March – Adolf Seel, German painter (died 1907)

 3 September – Adolf Eugen Fick, German-born physician, physiologist (d. 1901)
 12 September – Anselm Feuerbach, German classicist painter (died 1880)
 7 September – August Kekulé, German chemist (d. 1896)
 12 September – Anselm Feuerbach, German painter (d. 1880)

Deaths 
 6 January – Amalia Holst, German writer, intellectual, and feminist (b. 1758)
 11 January – Karl Wilhelm Friedrich von Schlegel, German poet and critic (born 1772)
 12 January – Karl Wilhelm Friedrich Schlegel, German poet, philosopher, and philologist (b. 1772)
 26 February – Johann Heinrich Wilhelm Tischbein, German painter (b. 1751)
 2 March – Karl Gottfried Hagen, German chemist (b. 1749)
 21 May – Peter I, Grand Duke of Oldenburg (b. 1755)
 15 June – Therese Huber, German writer and scholar (b. 1764)
 7 July – Jacob Friedrich von Abel, German philosopher (born 1751)

References

Years of the 19th century in Germany
1829 by country
Germany
Germany